JTT may refer to:
 Japan Turbine Technologies
 Jet-2000, a Russian airline
 Jonathan Taylor Thomas (born 1981), American actor